"Live at Wembley Stadium 1991" is a live album recorded by Australian band INXS.

Background and release
On 13 July 1991, INXS were filmed in concert at Wembley Stadium in London, performing to a sold-out mass of 72,000 fans. This concert was filmed in 35 mm and directed by David Mallet with no less than 17 cameras.

The album was released in February 2014 to coincide with the screening of INXS: Never Tear Us Apart, an Australian miniseries about INXS that commenced airing on 9 February 2014 and concluded the following week on 16 February on the Seven Network.

Track listing
The album was released as a digital download on 7 February 2014.

 "Guns in the Sky" – 3:27
 "New Sensation" – 3:54
 "I Send a Message" – 3:41
 "The Stairs" – 4:59
 "Know the Difference" – 3:47
 "Disappear" – 4:12
 "By My Side" – 3:10
 "Hear That Sound" – 3:44
 "Original Sin" – 6:17
 "The Loved One" – 4:06
 "Wildlife" – 3:32
 "Mystify" – 3:18
 "Bitter Tears" – 4:12
 "Suicide Blonde" – 4:32
 "What You Need" – 6:30
 "Kick" – 3:30
 "Need You Tonight" – 2:57
 "Mediate" – 5:32
 "Never Tear Us Apart" – 3:47
 "Who Pays the Price" – 3:39
 "Devil Inside" – 7:13
 "Shining Star" – 3:40

Charts
Live at Wembley Stadium 1991 was a commercial success, reaching #4 on the Australian iTunes albums chart before peaking at #17 on ARIA Albums Chart.

INXS: Live Baby Live Wembley Stadium

A fully restored film edition of the Wembley Stadium performance was released in 2019, with CD and vinyl editions.
"Guns in the Sky"
"New Sensation"
"I Send a Message"
"The Stairs"
"Know the Difference"
"Disappear"
"By My Side"
"Hear That Sound"
"Original Sin
"Lately" (previously unreleased)
"The Loved One"
"Wild Life"
"Mystify"
"Bitter Tears"
"Suicide Blonde"
"What You Need"
"Kick"
"Need You Tonight"
"Mediate"
"Never Tear Us Apart"
"Who Pays the Price"
"Devil Inside"

See also
INXS discography
Live Baby Live

References

2014 live albums
INXS live albums
Live albums recorded at Wembley Stadium